The swallow-tailed bee-eater (Merops hirundineus) is a near passerine bird in the bee-eater family, Meropidae.

Description
This species, like other bee-eaters, is a richly coloured, slender bird. Its colours and readily visible forked tail make it unmistakable. It is mainly green with a yellow throat, blue gorget and black eye stripe and beak. It can reach a length of 20–22 cm, including the long forked green or blue feathers. Sexes are alike.

Distribution and habitat
It breeds in savannah woodlands of sub-Saharan Africa. It is partially migratory, moving in response to rainfall patterns. This is a species which prefers somewhat more wooded country than most bee-eaters.

Behaviour
This attractive bird is readily approached. Just as the name suggests, bee-eaters predominantly eat  insects, especially bees, wasps and  hornets, which are caught in the air by sorties from an open perch.  The swallowtail has a preference for honeybees.

These bee-eaters nest as pairs or in very small colonies in sandy banks, or similar flat ground. They make a relatively long tunnel in which the 2 to 4 spherical, white eggs are laid. They also feed and roost communally.

References

External links
 Swallow-tailed bee-eater - Species text in The Atlas of Southern African Birds.

swallow-tailed bee-eater
Birds of Sub-Saharan Africa
swallow-tailed bee-eater
swallow-tailed bee-eater